Triad or triade may refer to:

 a group of three

Businesses and organisations 
 Triad (American fraternities), certain historic groupings of seminal college fraternities in North America
 Triad (organized crime), a Chinese transnational organized crime syndicate 
 Triad Broadcasting, an American radio station operator
 Triad High School (disambiguation), several uses
 Triad Hospitals, an American hospital operator
 Triad International, a multi-national private investment corporation
 Triad Racing Technologies, a body parts and chassis supplier for NASCAR teams
 Triad Securities, a finance company
 Triad Strategies, an American lobbying firm
 Triad Theater, a performing arts venue in New York City

Arts and entertainment

Fictional characters
 The Triad (Charmed), fictional characters in the TV series
 Triad (superhero), alias of DC Comics' Luornu Durgo

Film and television 
 Triad (film), a 1938 German film
 Triads, Yardies and Onion Bhajees, a 2003 British film 
 Triad, a 2012 Hong Kong film starring William Chan

Set Theory 
A Triad is a Set with Three Elements.
See: https://mathworld.wolfram.com/Triad.html

Music 
 Triad (music), chord consisting of root, third and fifth
 The Triad (album), by Pantha du Prince, 2016
 Triad (band), a Swedish music group
 "Triad", a track on Enya's 1987 album Enya
 "Triad" (Pitchshifter song), 1993 
 "Triad" (David Crosby song), 1967
 "Triad", a song by Tool from their 2001 album Lateralus
 “Triad”, a song by Jefferson Airplane from their 1968 album “Crown Of Creation”

Other uses in arts and entertainment  
 Triad, a 2013 video game by Anna Anthropy
 Triad (sculpture), a 1980 outdoor sculpture by Evelyn Franz
 Welsh Triads, collections of medieval Welsh legend and history
 Triads of Ireland, a collection of Old Irish writings

Science and technology 
 Triad (anatomy), structure in skeletal muscles, formed by a T tubule surrounded by sarcoplasmic reticulum
 Triad (computing), 3 bits  of information storage
 Triad (environmental science), management system for environmental cleanup
 Triad (monitors), group of three phosphor dots used in some computer monitors
 Triad, a brand name of the combination medication butalbital/acetaminophen
 List of medical triads, tetrads, and pentads

Other uses
 Triad (religion), a grouping of three gods
 Triad (relationship), or ménage à trois
 Triad (sociology), a group of three people as a unit of study
 The Triad (mountain), in Washington, U.S.
 Trichotomy (philosophy), often called triads
 HMS Triad (N53), T-class submarine of the UK Royal Navy
 Piedmont Triad, or simply the Triad, a region of North Carolina, U.S.
 Triad Islands, in Antarctica
 A nuclear triad

See also 

 3 (disambiguation)
 Third (disambiguation)
 Triadic (disambiguation)
 Trichotomy (disambiguation)
 Trinity (disambiguation)
 Trio (disambiguation)
 Triple (disambiguation)
 Triplet (disambiguation)
 Troika (disambiguation)
 Triadi, a village in Thessaloniki, Greece
 Triadization, a proposed alternative to the theory of globalization
 Triiad, a fictional entity in TV series Hypernauts
 Triumvirate
 Dyad (disambiguation) ("group of 2")
 Tetrad (disambiguation) ("group of 4")
 Hendiatris, figure of speech 

3 (number)